C14, C.XIV or C-14 may refer to:
 Autovía C-14, a highway in Catalonia in Spain
 Fokker C.XIV, a 1937 Dutch reconnaissance seaplane
 , a 1908 British C-class submarine
 LSWR C14 class, a London and South Western Railway locomotive class
 LNER Class C14, a class of British steam locomotives 
 Ramal C-14, the Argentinian track of the Salta–Antofagasta railway
 Sauber C14, a 1995 racing car
 C14 or S14 (Ukrainian group), a radical nationalist group in Ukraine
 The 14th century
 C 14-class missile boat, a light missile boat of catamaran design
 Carbon-14, a radioactive isotope of carbon
 C-14 dating, a method for dating events
 IEC 60320 C14, a polarised, three pole socket electrical connector
 Boeing YC-14, an American experimental transport aircraft of the 1970s
 Malignant neoplasm of other and ill-defined sites in the lip, oral cavity and pharynx ICD-10 code
 C14 Timberwolf, a Canadian .338 Lapua sniper rifle
 Caldwell 14, the Double Cluster in the constellation Perseus
 French Defence, an Encyclopedia of Chess Openings code
 Concours 14 or Kawasaki 1400GTR, a 1,352cc motorcycle
 Bill C-14, a bill legalizing euthanasia in Canada